The America the Beautiful Pass (also known as the Interagency Pass) series comprises annual or lifetime passes that grant the holder entrance to more than 2,000 federally protected areas including national parks, national monuments, and other protected areas managed by six federal agencies: the National Park Service, the Forest Service, the Fish and Wildlife Service, the Bureau of Land Management, the Bureau of Reclamation, and the Army Corps of Engineers. At per-vehicle fee areas, the pass entitles the holder and all passengers in a non-commercial vehicle to admission. At per-person fee areas, the pass entitles the holder and up to three additional adults to admission (children under 16 are always admitted free). The pass was created by the Federal Lands Recreation Enhancement Act and authorized by Congress in December 2004, which is Division J, Title VIII of the Consolidated Appropriations Act, 2005, Public Law 108–447, 118 Stat. 2809, an omnibus appropriations act. Passes are available at all National Park Service sites that charge entrance fees as well as online through the United States Geological Survey online store. The passes have been described as one of the best deals in recreation.



Series
 Annual Pass – a 12-month period pass available to everyone for $80, or for free to members of the U.S. military and their dependents. Passes are valid through the last day of the month in which it is issued the following year.
 Annual 4th Grade Pass – a free pass available to U.S. 4th graders (or children 10 years of age) that is valid from September through the following August. While children of this age are generally admitted free already, the pass allows free entry for their parents and others accompanying them.
 Senior Pass – a lifetime pass for $80 (or annual pass for $20) available to U.S. citizens or permanent residents aged 62 or older. It replaced the Golden Age Passport that functioned similarly and is still valid for those possessing one.
 Access Pass – a free lifetime pass for U.S. citizens or permanent residents with permanent disabilities. It replaced the Golden Access Passport that functioned similarly and is still valid for those possessing one.
 Volunteer Pass – a free annual pass for volunteers (including Volunteers-In-Parks) acquiring 250 service hours with participating federal agencies.

The Senior and Access passes additionally provide a 50% discount on some amenity fees such as camping, swimming, boat launching, and specialized interpretive services at some sites.

See also
List of fee areas in the United States National Park System
List of the United States National Park System official units

References

National Park Service